The 2018 Grand Prix Hassan II was a professional tennis tournament played on clay courts. It was the 34th edition of the tournament and part of the 2018 ATP World Tour. It took place in Marrakesh, Morocco between 9 and 15 April 2018.

Singles main-draw entrants

Seeds 

 1 Rankings are as of April 2, 2018.

Other entrants 
The following players received wildcards into the singles main draw:
  Amine Ahouda
  Malek Jaziri
  Lamine Ouahab

The following players received entry using a protected ranking:
  Pablo Andújar

The following players received entry from the qualifying draw:
  Andrea Arnaboldi
  Calvin Hemery
  Pedro Martínez
  Alexey Vatutin

The following player received entry as a lucky loser:
  Ilya Ivashka

Withdrawals 
Before the tournament
  Borna Ćorić → replaced by  Pablo Andújar
  Federico Delbonis → replaced by  Radu Albot
  Damir Džumhur → replaced by  Nikoloz Basilashvili
  Filip Krajinović → replaced by  Roberto Carballés Baena
  Gaël Monfils → replaced by  Matteo Berrettini
  Viktor Troicki → replaced by  Ilya Ivashka

Retirements 
  Jiří Veselý

Doubles main-draw entrants

Seeds 

 Rankings are as of April 2, 2018.

Other entrants 
The following pairs received wildcards into the doubles main draw:
  Amine Ahouda /  Yassine Idmbarek 
  Malek Jaziri /  Lamine Ouahab

Champions

Singles 

  Pablo Andújar def.  Kyle Edmund, 6–2, 6–2

Doubles 

  Nikola Mektić /  Alexander Peya def.  Benoît Paire /  Édouard Roger-Vasselin, 7–5, 3–6, [10–7]

References

External links